Sandra Kornelia Zwolle (born 15 March 1971) is a retired speed skater from the Netherlands who was active between 1988 and 1999. She competed at the 1998 Winter Olympics in the 500 m and 1000 m and finished in 17th and 15th place, respectively. She won a bronze medal in the 1500 m at the world championships in 1996 and a silver medal in the 1000 m in 1997. Nationally, she won the 1000 m in 1995 and 1996 and collected more than ten silver and bronze medals in various disciplines between 1991 and 1999.

After retirement from competitions she worked as a sports commentator at the Thialf ice arena.

Personal bests: 
   500 m –    39.88 (1998)
 1000 m – 1:17.69 (1998)
 1500 m – 2:02.74 (1996)
 3000 m – 4:31.25 (1996)
 5000 m – 8:01.01 (1992)

References

1971 births
Living people
Dutch female speed skaters
Olympic speed skaters of the Netherlands
Speed skaters at the 1998 Winter Olympics
Sportspeople from Heerenveen
World Single Distances Speed Skating Championships medalists
21st-century Dutch women
20th-century Dutch women